The Dollar Princess is a musical in three acts, with music by Leo Fall, adapted into English by Basil Hood with lyrics by Adrian Ross (from the 1907 Die Dollarprinzessin with a German-language libretto by A. M. Willner and Fritz Grünbaum, after a comedy by Gatti-Trotha). It opened in London at Daly's Theatre on 25 September 1909, running for 428 performances.  The London production starred Lily Elsie, Joseph Coyne, W. H. Berry and Gabrielle Ray.  The young Gladys Cooper played a small role.

It also had a very successful run on Broadway, with a new book and lyrics by George Grossmith, Jr. and additional numbers by Jerome Kern, opening on 6 August 1909 and running for 288 performances.  Valli Valli, Adrienne Augarde and Louie Pounds starred in the New York production.

In late Victorian and Edwardian Britain, "Dollar Princess" was the nickname given to American heiresses.  Playgoer and Society Illustrated wrote, "To the average playgoer there is something very attractive in watching the antics of the vulgar when surrounded by the refinement of art which he can neither understand nor appreciate.... Miss Lily Elsie, as Alice, shows even an improvement on her performance in The Merry Widow. The inimitable Mr. Joseph Coyne has put a lot more into his part than was possible on the first night.... He is great! His American accent is a thing to listen to...."

Roles and London cast list
Freddy Fairfax – Robert Michaelis
Harry Q. Conder (a multi-millionaire) – Joseph Coyne
Mr. Bulger (Conder's confidential clerk) – W. H. Berry 
Dick (cousin to Conder) – Evelyn Beerbohm
John, Earl of Quorn (Conder's groom) – Basil S. Foster
Sir James Mcgregor (Conder's footman) – Willie Warde 
Duke of Stonehenge (Conder's butler)  – F. J. Blackman 
Vicomte de Brésac (Conder's chef) – Garnet Wilson 
Lieut. Grant (U.S.A.)  – Harold Deacon 
Olga (a lion queen) – Emmy Wehlen 
Daisy (Dick's sister) – Gabrielle Ray 
Dulcie Du Cros (a Californian girl) – May Kinder 
Sadie Von Tromp (her friend) – Gladys Cooper 
Lady Augusta – Phyllis Le Grand 
Lady Dorothy – May Hobson 
Lady Gwendoline – Gertrude Glyn 
Lady Margaret – Marion Lindsay 
Hon. Editha Dalrymple – Dolly Dombey 
Alice (Conder's sister) – Lily Elsie

Synopsis
English version
A young American oil tycoon, when recruiting domestic staff, takes on a succession of impoverished members of the European aristocracy.  But the servants he selects are all very well connected. "Tho' we came here in the steerage, all are members of the peerage."  His sister, who has money, later follows the course of true love and takes a job in another household pretending to be impoverished.

American version
Three plot lines take place concurrently: First, an American girl, the daughter of the President of the Coal Trust (the Dollar Princess), falls in love with a young Englishman and tries to win his heart.  Meanwhile, the millionaire father has an affair with a supposed Countess, who turns out to be a lion tamer.  Also, his niece, Daisy, marries a young Marquis, but she refuses to be anything but his friend.

Musical numbers
Act I   -   Conder's House in New York. 
No. 1 - Chorus - "We're the household of the great Mister Harry Conder, drawn from ev'ry ancient state over the ocean yonder!" 
No. 1a - Alice - "A self-made Yankee maiden, she isn't greatly drawn to castles mortgage-laden, and coronets in pawn!" 
No. 2 - Daisy and Quorn - "I'm very sorry if you've thought I do not serve you as I might! ... Oh, no!  Not that, but still you might be more attentive" 
No. 3 - Freddy - "A little maiden by the way, so simple, sweet and fair, is not the love for whom I pray, you meet her ev'ry where!" 
No. 4 - Alice and Freddy - "The people round that I am paying must be good-looking, that's my whim!  It's what papa is always saying" 
No. 5 - Olga, Conder, Dick and Bulger - "Myself the Countess I'll introduce: Olga Alaska Tabasco Kachewska! ... Can you repeat it, please?" 
No. 6 - Finale Act I - "And now assemble all my household here!  Let ev'rybody instantly appear!  Before in feast we give our joy expansion, I'll introduce"

Act II   -   Garden Court, Conder's House. 
No. 7 - Chorus - "In afternoon of sunny June across the lawn the net is drawn.  You take your racquet and your ball, and men and maidens say: Love all!" 
No. 8 - Conder and Girls - "Mister, Mister Conder, whither will you wander?  You are like a child again!  Why are you so very juvenile and merry?" 
No. 9 - Alice and Freddy - "A secretary such as you is nothing to his betters; and he can write, is that not true?  Their most intimate letters!" 
No. 10 - Daisy and Sir James - "I may be going rather soon on an extensive honeymoon, so I suppose I must buy clothes ... Ladies at times wear those" 
No. 11 - Bulger - "Some women may have loved me for my face - I do not know.  And some for that 'Je ne sais quoi' I call my 'Touch and go'" 
No. 12 - Alice and Conder - "Many a time, my brother, we have laughed and cried.  We both were very naughty, then we used to run and hide!" 
No. 13 - Olga and Conder - "Ah!  Ah!  I'm Queen of men, Parisienne, la fine fleur de Paris.  Ah!  Ah!  Tout de même, je vous aime!  Do you care for me?" 
No. 14 - Alice, Daisy, Quorn and Freddy - "Who are the girls that glitter and glance, full in the sun of joy?  Life is to them like a marvellous dance" 
No. 15 - Finale Act II - "We're delighted here invited to attend these gorgeous fêtes!  Quite surprising, and out classing those of European states"

Act III   -   Freddy's Bungalow in California. 
No. 15a - Entr'Acte 
No. 16 - Opening of Act III 
No. 17 - Daisy and Bulger - "We are a couple of happy tramps, low on scamps, happy tramps;  everywhere we will pitch our camps" 
No. 18 - Daisy and Quorn - "Please my lord and master, you'll be true to me? ... Yes, my little darling, I will be.  Shall we find when married" 
No. 19 - "Hip, hip, hurrah! ... So ring the merry wedding bells to hail this day! ... Hip, hip, hurrah! ... For we're the most tremendous swells in U. S. A!" 
No. 20 - Alice and Freddy - "Then you go? ... And you stay! ... What must I do? ... You act for me when I'm away, just as I used to do for you!"

See also
Die Dollarprinzessin, the original work.

Notes

References
List of roles, list of songs and other information
Description of the show
From StageBeauty.net; includes a review of the New York production by the New York Times, dated 7 July 1909

External links
Information about an exhibition on "Dollar Princesses" in Bath, England
The Play Pictorial information, includes the London opening cast list
Numerous photos from the original production of The Dollar Princess
Information from IBDB about the New York production
Links to midi files, lyrics and London cast list
The Dollar Princess costume designs, circa 1909, held by the Billy Rose Theatre Division, New York Public Library for the Performing Arts

Musicals by Jerome Kern
Compositions by Leo Fall
1909 musicals
West End musicals
Musicals based on operas